Fenerbahçe Ülker Sports and Event Hall is a multi-purpose indoor arena that is located in Ataşehir, Istanbul, Turkey. The arena is owned and operated by Fenerbahçe S.K. The arena has a capacity of 15,000 people for concerts and 13,059 for basketball games, and it has hosted national and international sports events, such as basketball, volleyball, wrestling, and weightlifting; as well as concerts and congresses.

Structure and features
The arena also has fast-food cafeterias and restaurants. It also has 6 locker room areas, 5 additional small locker rooms, 44 lounge areas, VIP seating areas, and a 2,500 capacity hall, which can be used for both training and practice games. Including the lounge and VIP areas, the arena can seat up to 13,800 people for sporting events.

History
Ülker Sports Arena was inaugurated on 25 January 2012, with the Fenerbahçe versus EA7 Emporio Armani game in the EuroLeague 2011–12 season's Top 16 stage. Fenerbahçe's small forward Marko Tomas, scored the first points in the arena, with a 2-point jump shot, during the game against EA7 Emporio Armani. Fenerbahçe S.K.'s basketball departments, Fenerbahçe Men's Basketball and Fenerbahçe Women's Basketball, are currently playing their home games in the arena.

Concerts and events

2012
 April 27, Mister Universe 2012 Pageant
 September 19, Leonard Cohen performed during his Old Ideas World Tour
 September 22 – October 14, Alegría (Cirque du Soleil)
 October 5, Boston Celtics 2012 NBA Europe Live Tour 
 November 16–17, Jennifer Lopez as a part of her Dance Again World Tour

2013
 February 23, WWE RAW World Tour
 March 15–17, Michael Jackson: The Immortal World Tour
 April 6, Glory kickboxing
 April 27, Mark Knopfler as a part of Privateering Tour
 May 3–12, We Will Rock You (musical) as a part of We Will Rock You: 10th Anniversary Tour
 September 7, Music Bank World Tour
 October 5, Oklahoma City Thunder 2013 NBA Europe Live Tour

2014
 October 3–5, FIBA World Championship for Women Finals
 October 11, San Antonio Spurs 2014 NBA Europe Live Tour
 November 16, Demi Lovato as a part of her Demi World Tour

2015
 2 January – 9 April 2014–15 EuroLeague Top 16 Group F
 14–16 April 2014–15 EuroLeague Quarterfinals
 August 8, League of Legends Finals of Turkey
 30 December 2015–16 EuroLeague Top 16

2016
 14 January – 1 April 2015–16 EuroLeague Top 16
 12–14 April 2016 EuroLeague Playoffs
2017
 2017 EuroBasket

EuroLeague attendances
This is a list of the EuroLeague game attendances of Fenerbahçe at Ülker Sports Arena.

Gallery

See also
List of indoor arenas in Turkey

References

External links 

Official website 

Sports venues in Istanbul
Basketball venues in Turkey
Indoor arenas in Turkey
Music venues in Istanbul
Fenerbahçe S.K.
Fenerbahçe Basketball
Fenerbahçe Volleyball
Sports venues completed in 2012
Volleyball venues in Turkey
Sport in Ataşehir
2012 establishments in Turkey
Turkish Basketball League venues